Sugar Bogue is a stream in the U.S. state of Mississippi. It is a tributary to Coffee Bogue.

Sugar Bogue is a name corrupted from the Choctaw language and purported to have the original meaning "hog creek". A variant name is "Sugar Bogue Creek".

References

Rivers of Mississippi
Rivers of Scott County, Mississippi
Mississippi placenames of Native American origin